Antifogmatic is the second album by Punch Brothers. The album was released June 15, 2010.

Background
The Paducah Sun reported, on February 25, 2010, that the album contains ten songs: “'The new music is a real honest collaboration,' Thile said. It is the first album to feature bass player Paul Kowert, who joined the band in late 2008 after the departure of Greg Garrison.  Thile said the 10 songs are shorter and more melodic with no leading man. The album was produced by Jon Brion.

Punch Brothers also released a deluxe version of Antifogmatic which contains a four-song EP All Of This Is True and a seven-song live DVD from the band's 2009 residency at New York's The Living Room called Live from the Lower East Side: It's p-Bingo Night! The DVD was directed by Mark Meatto and produced by Michael Bohlmann, the filmmakers behind How to Grow a Band a feature documentary about Punch Brothers released in April of 2012.

From the Nonesuch site: "Antifogmatic is named after a type of 19th-century alcoholic drink that was meant as a cure for the effects of fog and other inclement weather. On choosing the title, Thile notes, '"Antifogmatic" is an old term for a bracing beverage, generally rum or whiskey, that a person would have before going out to work in rough weather to stave off any ill effects. This batch of tunes could be used in much the same way, and includes some characters who would probably benefit mightily, if temporarily, from a good antifogmatic.'"

On June 12, attendees of the 2010 Bonnaroo Music Festival were given the opportunity to purchase the new album three days before the official release, after Punch Brothers played at the Festival. One of Punch Brothers' performances at the Festival was also streamed live over Bonnaroo's YouTube channel and included songs from Antifogmatic.

Track listing

Bonus Tracks

Deluxe Edition

All of This Is True EP

Live from the Lower East Side: It's p-Bingo Night! (as a DVD)

Personnel 
Punch Brothers
 Chris Thile - mandolin, vocals
 Gabe Witcher - fiddle, vocals
 Noam Pikelny - banjo, vocals
 Chris Eldridge - guitar, vocals
 Paul Kowert - double bass, vocals

References

External links 
 Punch Brothers official website
 Album page on Nonesuch
 Antifogmatic named Rhapsody's Album Of The Day

2010 albums
Punch Brothers albums
Nonesuch Records albums
Albums produced by Jon Brion